The 1977 season was the Minnesota Vikings' 17th in the National Football League. After starting the season 5–3, the team's starting quarterback Fran Tarkenton broke his leg in week 9 and missed the rest of the season. Despite losing Tarkenton, the team managed to finish the season with a 9–5 record and went to the playoffs as winners of the NFC Central division title. They beat the Los Angeles Rams 14–7 in the Divisional Round in a game played in Los Angeles and termed the Mud Bowl, although the Vikings had lost 35–3 to the same opponent in week 6. In the NFC Championship game played in Dallas, the Vikings lost to the Dallas Cowboys 23–6.

Offseason

1977 Draft

 The Vikings traded their fourth-round selection (111th overall) to the Seattle Seahawks in exchange for WR Ahmad Rashad.
 The Vikings traded their sixth-round selection (166th overall) and 1976 eighth-round selection (235th overall) to the New England Patriots in exchange for OL Doug Dumler.
 The Vikings traded their seventh-round selection (194th overall) to the Cincinnati Bengals in exchange for TE Orlando Nelson.

Roster

Preseason

Regular season

Schedule

Game summaries

Week 7: at Atlanta Falcons
Television network: CBS
Announcers: Pat Summerall and Tom Brookshier
Minnesota's Fran Tarkenton threw a 54-yard touchdown pass to Sammy White to tie the game in the second quarter, then tossed a 6-yard scoring pass to Bob Tucker in the fourth quarter after Chuck Foreman's 51-yard run to salvage a big win for the Vikings. The Falcons took the lead early lead on a 49-yard scoring pass from Scott Hunter to Greg McCrary.

Week 10: at Chicago Bears

Week 11: at Green Bay Packers

Week 13: at Oakland Raiders

Standings

Postseason

Statistics

Team leaders

League rankings

References

Minnesota Vikings seasons
Minnesota Vikings
Minnesota Vikings
NFC Central championship seasons